Bashtin District is a district (bakhsh) in Davarzan County, Razavi Khorasan Province, Iran. The district was created effective 15 May 2012. At the 2006 census, its population was 9,936, in 2,989 families. The District has no cities. The District has two rural districts (dehestan): Bashtin Rural District and Mehr Rural District.

References 

Districts of Razavi Khorasan Province
Davarzan County
2012 establishments in Iran